Sembehun is a town in Bo District, in the Southern Province of Sierra Leone. The Mende predominate in the town. Sembehun was the Kamajors stronghold during the Sierra Leone civil war.

Populated places in Sierra Leone
Southern Province, Sierra Leone